Michael Stich was the defending champion, but lost in the second round this year.

Wayne Ferreira won the tournament, beating Jamie Morgan in the final, 6–2, 6–7(5–7), 6–2.

Seeds

Draw

Finals

Top half

Bottom half

External links
 Main draw

OTB Open
1992 ATP Tour